Canada competed at the 2022 World Games held in Birmingham, United States from 7 to 17 July 2022. Athletes representing Canada won five gold medals, five silver medals and five bronze medals. The country finished in 14th place in the medal table.

Medallists

Invitational sports

Competitors
The following is the list of number of competitors in the Games.

Archery

Canada competed in archery.

Men

Boules sports 

Canada competed in boules sports.

Bowling

Canada won two medals in bowling.

Cue sports

Canada competed in cue sports.

Floorball

Canada competed in the floorball tournament.

Summary

Group play

Fifth place game

Flying disc

Canada competed in the flying disc competition.

Inline hockey

Canada competed in the inline hockey tournament.

Ju-jitsu

Canada won two medals in ju-jitsu.

Karate

Canada competed in karate.

Women

Kickboxing

Canada competed in kickboxing.

Lacrosse

Canada won the gold medal in both the men's and women's lacrosse tournaments.

Muaythai

Canada competed in muaythai.

Orienteering

Canada competed in orienteering.

Powerlifting

Canada won one gold medal in powerlifting.

Women

Racquetball

Canada competed in racquetball.

Softball

Canada finished in 6th place in the softball tournament.

Squash

Canada competed in squash.

Trampoline gymnastics

Canada competed in trampoline gymnastics.

Water skiing

Canada won four medals in water skiing.

Wheelchair rugby

Canada competed in wheelchair rugby.

Wushu

Canada won two medals in wushu.

References

Nations at the 2022 World Games
2022
World Games